Marie Anne d'Orléans, petite-fille de France (Marie Anne; 9 November 1652 – 17 August 1656) was a French Princess and youngest daughter of Gaston d'Orléans. She held the rank of Grand daughter of France. She was a member of the House of Orléans.

Biography

Born at the Palais d'Orléans, the present day Luxembourg Palace in Paris, she was the youngest daughter born to the Duke and Duchess of Orléans.

Her father, Gaston d'Orléans, was the youngest brother of the late Louis XIII; as such, Marie Anne was born during the reign of his first cousin, the 12-year-old Louis XIV. 
As a grand daughter of France, Marie Anne was allowed the style of Royal Highness and was known as Mademoiselle de Chartres from birth.

Her older siblings included the future Grande Mademoiselle, the Grand Duchess of Tuscany, Duchess of Guise and the short lived Duchess of Savoy. Her only brother the Duke of Valois died in 1652 aged a year and a half.

She died at the Palais d'Orléans and was buried at the Royal Basilica of Saint Denis outside Paris, the traditional burial place of the House of Bourbon.

Ancestors

References and notes

1652 births
1656 deaths
Nobility from Paris
Marie Anne
Marie Anne
Marie Anne
17th-century French nobility
Burials at the Basilica of Saint-Denis
Royalty and nobility who died as children